MTBVAC is a vaccine candidate against tuberculosis in humans currently in research trials. It is based on a genetically modified form of the Mycobacterium tuberculosis pathogen isolated from humans.

Manufacturing 
The vaccine was constructed at University of Zaragoza in the laboratory of the Mycobacterial Genetics group, which forms part of CIBERES since the beginning of the project, in collaboration with Dr. Brigitte Gicquel of the Pasteur Institute in Paris. Currently, the University of Zaragoza has an industrial partner: the Spanish biotechnology company BIOFABRI, belonging to ZENDAL group, responsible for the industrial and clinical development of MTBVAC, studying its immunity and safety in two Phase IIa trials in newborn babies and adults in South Africa. Vaccine therapeutic efficacy studies are expected to begin in 2022. For the Clinical Development of MTBVAC, the tuberculosis vaccine project counts with the advice and support of the European TBVI (since 2008) and since 2016, with IAVI for the clinical development in adults and adolescents.

Construction and molecular characterization 
MTBVAC discovery follows the principles of vaccination as per Luis Pasteur: isolation of the human pathogen, attenuation by rational inactivation of selected genes, protection assays in animal models, and evaluation in humans. The rational attenuation of MTBVAC was achieved by inactivation of the phoP and fadD26 genes, following the international guidelines to progress live vaccines into clinical development. Similar to BCG, which was conceived in the early 1900’s as an attenuated strain of Mycobacterium bovis causing TB in cows and transmitted to humans mainly through ingestion of unpasteurized milk, the discovery of MTBVAC starts with an unusual outbreak of a multidrug-resistant M. bovis killing more than 100 HIV- positive individuals in Spain in the early 1990s. From that outbreak, Prof Carlos Martin and his group identified the phoP gene as a key player in M. tuberculosis virulence. The gene phoP encodes the transcription factor PhoP of the two-component system PhoP/PhoR essential for M. tuberculosis virulence. PhoP was shown to regulate between 2 and 4 % of M. tuberculosis genes, most of which participate in well-known virulence pathways of the tubercle bacillus. As a consequence of the phoP inactivation, MTBVAC can produce but is unable to export ESAT-6, which results in virulence attenuation, but yet maintains the epitopes present in this immunogenic protein.  Other relevant virulence genes regulated by PhoP are involved in biosynthesis of the polyketide-derived acyltrehaloses (DAT, PAT) and sulfolipids (SL), which are front-line lipid constituents of the cell wall interfering with the recognition of M. tuberculosis by the immune system. Finally, PhoP is able to modulate protein secretion, and inactivation of phoP in MTBVAC results in higher secretion of immunogenic proteins such as the Ag85 complex 6. The fadD26 gene is the first gene in an operon required for the biosynthesis and export of phthiocerol dimycocerosates (PDIM), the main virulence-associated cell-wall lipids of M. tuberculosis

Preclinical research 
The main advantage of using live vaccines based on rational attenuation of M. tuberculosis is their ability to keep the genetic repertoire encoding immunodominant antigens absent in BCG., whereas chromosomal deletions in virulence genes provide assurance for safety and genetic stability. Such vaccines are expected to safely induce more specific and longer lasting immune responses in humans that can provide protection against all forms of the disease. This is the rationale that has been followed in the development of the live-attenuated MTBVAC. Rigorous preclinical studies in different TB-relevant animal models - mice, guinea pigs and non-human primates - conducted between 2001-2011 have shown adequate attenuation, safety and improved immunogenicity and protective efficacy against M. tuberculosis challenge as compared to BCG, thus fulfilling regulatory WHO guidelines and the Geneva consensus requirements for progressing live mycobacterial vaccines to first-in-human Phase 1 clinical evaluation

Clinical trials 
The safety and immunogenicity of new vaccines need to be determined in a reduced number of healthy volunteers. Phase 1 studies (can be first-in-human) to define the safety of different ascending doses are usually conducted in small groups of no more than 100 volunteers per trial. These are followed by medium-sized Phase 2 trials (can be > 100) to corroborate safety and determine the optimal therapeutic dose (detailed immunogenicity profile in the case of new vaccines) that helps select the final dose for Phase 3 efficacy evaluation.

The MTBVAC clinical development started with a first-in-human study in healthy adult volunteers in Lausanne, Switzerland (NCT02013245); followed by one additional  Phase 1 study in healthy newborns in South Africa in collaboration with South African TuBerculosis Vaccine Initiative (SATVI) (NCT02729571) to corroborate the safety and greater immunogenic potential of MTBVAC in this age-group relative to BCG. Two dose-defining Phase 2 studies were conducted at SATVI covering adults with and without previous exposure to M. tuberculosis (NCT02933281) (ended in Sep 2021) and healthy newborns (NCT03536117) that will be finalized in March 2022. 

Data from the Phase II clinical trials will help define the final (safest and most immunogenic) dose of MTBVAC, triggering the initiation of a multi-center Phase 3 efficacy trial in newborn babies by the second quarter of 2022. Supported by the European & Developing Countries Clinical Trials Partnership (EDCTP funding), this Phase 3 trial will encompass TB-endemic regions of Sub-Saharan Africa, including South Africa, Madagascar and Senegal (registered on ClinicalTrials.gov, NCT04975178).

References

Vaccination
Tuberculosis